The Province of Cremona is a province in the Lombardy region of Italy. Its capital city is Cremona.

The province occupies the central section of Padana Plain, so the whole territory is flat, without any mountains or hills, crossed by several rivers, such as the Serio and Adda, and artificial canals, most of which are used for irrigation.

The river Po, which is the longest Italian river, is the natural boundary with the adjoining Province of Piacenza, while the Oglio separates the province from Brescia.

History
Lombardy has been inhabited since ancient times and stone age and Bronze Age rock drawings and artefacts have been found there. From the fifth century BC, Gallic tribes invaded and settled in the region, building several cities (including Milan) and ruling the land as far as the Adriatic Sea. From the third century BC the Romans expanded their sphere of influence into the area, and in 194 BC, the whole of what is now Lombardy, became a Roman province called Gallia Cisalpina. The Romans overwhelmed the previous civilisations and Lombardy became one of the richest and best-developed areas in Italy. It was here in 313 AD that the Roman Emperor Constantine the Great issued the famous Edict of Milan that gave freedom of religion to all people in the Roman Empire.

Following the collapse of the Western Roman Empire, Lombardy was invaded by successive waves of tribes, the last of which was the Germanic Lombards in the late sixth century. Stability followed until 774, when the Frankish king Charlemagne conquered the area and annexed the Kingdom of the Lombards (most of northern and central Italy) to his empire.

Geography

The province of Cremona is a long, relatively narrow part of the Padana Plain in northern Italy, the outline of which is circumscribed by rivers. The province is orientated from northwest to southeast. To the west of the province lies the Province of Lodi, to the northwest lies the Province of Milan, to the north lies the Province of Bergamo, to the east lies the Province of Brescia, and to the southeast lies the Province of Mantua. The region of Emilia-Romagna lies to the south, Cremona abutting onto the Province of Reggio Emilia, the Province of Parma and the Province of Piacenza.

Several rivers flow across the Lombardy Plain to join the Po which runs along the southern border of the province. The Adda separates Cremona from the Province of Lodi and the Oglio provides the border with the Province of Mantua. Other rivers in the north of the province include the Serio and the Tormo, and the Mella makes up a short stretch of the border with the Province of Brescia. These rivers are linked by a network of canals which have been in place since at least the sixteenth century and are largely used for irrigation. The Muzza Canal takes its water from the river Adda and irrigates the land between that river and the river Ticino, converting the plain into a fertile area with rich meadows and productive agricultural land.

Although the province is essentially flat, there are some undulations in the surface formed by the varying courses of the rivers over the millennia. For historical reasons, the province is subdivided into four rural districts, centred on Crema, Soresina, Cremona and Casalmaggiore. In the north, some watercourses emerge from the ground in the "line of springs", a phenomenon of the northern Lombardy Plain, where melt-water from the Alps flows underground through porous gravelly soils before being forced to the surface when it reaches impervious, clayey ground.

The climate is largely uniform throughout the province.
 in July. There is often fog in winter, especially near the rivers.

Government

The Province of Cremona is an administrative body of intermediate level between a municipality (comune) and Lombardy region.

The three main functions devolved to the Province of Cremona are:
 local planning and zoning;
 provision of local police and fire services;
 transportation regulation (car registration, maintenance of local roads, etc.).

As an administrative institution, the Province of Cremona has its own elected bodies. From 1948 to 1995 the President of the Province of Cremona was chosen by the members of the Provincial Council, elected every five years by citizens. From 1995 to 2014, under provisions of the 1993 local administration reform, the President of the Province was chosen by popular election, originally every four, then every five years.

In a 2005 ruling of the European Court of Justice, the comune of Cingia de' Botti's award of a concession contract for public gas distribution services was criticised, as the contract had been awarded to a company called Padania without a competitive procurement process, contrary to EU regulations. Padania was a public-sector company owned by the province and most of the provincial  comunes, including Cingia de’ Botti, but also open, at least to some degree, to private part-ownership.

On 3 April 2014, the Italian Chamber of Deputies gave its final approval to the Law n.56/2014 which involved the transformation of the Italian provinces into "institutional bodies of second level". According to the 2014 reform, each province is headed by a President (or Commissioner) assisted by a legislative body, the Provincial Council, and an executive body, the Provincial Executive. President (Commissioner) and members of Council are elected together by mayors and city councilors of each municipality of the province respectively every four and two years. The Executive is chaired by the President (Commissioner) who appoint others members, called assessori. Since 2015, the President (Commissioner) and other members of the Council do not receive a salary.

In each province, there is also a Prefect (prefetto), a representative of the central government who heads an agency called prefettura-ufficio territoriale del governo. The Questor (questore) is the head of State's Police (Polizia di Stato) in the province and his office is called questura. There is also a province's police force depending from  local government, called provincial police (polizia provinciale).

This is a list of the Presidents of the Province since 1948:

Notes

Economy and culture

The principal economic resources of the province of Cremona are agricultural. Rice is grown with the help of water drawn from canals. Other crops include maize (corn), locally called Melegot and barley and to a lesser extent, soya and sugar beet. Grapes are cultivated and wine produced, and there is also a silk industry. The farms in the province are some of the most productive in the country. Other industries are quite developed, mostly in the northern zone, near Crema, where there are textiles, chemical, and mechanical factories.

Beef and dairy cattle are kept in the province. The beef serves as an ingredient for local dishes, and milk from the dairy cows is used to create traditional cheeses as well as producing butter and cream. The area is famous for its food specialities, such as nougat (Italian: torrone) and mustard. It is unclear exactly where torrone originated, but the recipe used in Cremona is the best known.

The city of Cremona has a strong musical tradition. The cathedral, built in the  twelfth century, provided a focus for musical activity and by the sixteenth century, the town was the musical centre of the region. Even now it attracts people to hear performances by ensembles and attend the many festivals. The Renaissance composer Marc'Antonio Ingegneri taught here, his most illustrious pupil being Claudio Monteverdi. The composer Pierre-Francisque Caroubel was born here and later moved to Wolfenbüttel in Germany to collaborate with Michael Praetorius. The town became renowned for the violins and other musical instruments that were made here (many members of the Stradivari, Amati, Guarneri and Bergonzi families of luthiers were all prominent citizens of Cremona), and was also well known for its concert bands. A band school was started here in 1864 under the auspices of the composer Amilcare Ponchielli. The "traditional violin craftsmanship in Cremona" was declared an intangible cultural heritage by UNESCO in 2012.

Municipalities
Here is a list of the most populated municipalities of the province.

Municipal government
Here is a list of the municipal government in cities and towns with more than 15,000 inhabitants:

Gallery

See also
 Comuni of the Province of Cremona

References

External links
 Official website 

 
Cremona
Cremona